= Melencolia Estatica =

Italian metal band

Melencolia Estatica is an Italian black metal band. They have released three albums.

== Discography ==
- Melencolia Estatica (2006)
- Letum (2008)
- Hël (2012)
